Zanthoxylum integrifoliolum is a species of plant in the family Rutaceae. It is found in the Philippines and Taiwan.

References

integrifoliolum
Data deficient plants
Taxonomy articles created by Polbot
Taxa named by Elmer Drew Merrill